The Sal Regional Football Association (Portuguese: Associação Regional de Futebol do Sal, abbreviation: ARFS) is a football (soccer) association covering the island of Sal.  It is headquartered in the city of Espargos, the island capital.

About the Island/Regional League
The area includes the whole island of Sal and includes its surrounding islets.

Organization
The association also organizes and functions the Sal Regional Championships, the Cup, the Super Cup and the Opening Tournament.  The association has 13 registered clubs, Santa Maria, Académica do Aeroporto do Sal and Académica do Sal are semi-pro clubs.  The regional champion competes in the National Championships each season, once did in the cup (2007, 2009, 2010, 2012) competition who competed at the national level. The regional championships has two divisions.

Sal Premier Division (8 clubs)
Sal Second Division (5 clubs)

History
The island league was founded in 1975 after Cape Verde became independent and became the third oldest island championships alongside Fogo and after Santiago.  The regional championships contained only six clubs and was the only region that not a single new club were added until 2014 when six new clubs were added and the Second Division were added as Sal's population grew.  In 2015, the Premier Division were added and for the 2015–16 season, it would feature eight clubs and the Second Division was reduced to four but awaiting new clubs in that division.  Pretória, based in the east of Espargos competed for the first time on March 27, 2017 and became the 13th and recent club on the island.

In 1999, the Sal Island Cup was founded, later in 2000, the Super Cup and Opening Tournament competitions were founded.

As ARFS was used for the Santiago Regional Football Association, until 2002 during its final dissolution of the organization, Sal's abbreviation was read as ARFSL.

Up to 2005, the championships had the second most clubs in the nation and up to 2011 was shared with Brava's.  Up to 2014, it was the championships that had the fewest clubs.  From 2015–16, it had the same number of clubs as that of Maio, since March 2017, it has a club more than Maio's.

Recently of club participations in the Premier Division.  ASGUI, a new participant was the first club ever to be relegated.  Until May 2017, neither of the original six clubs were been relegated, Verdun Pedra de Lume was the second unrelegated club to relegate as they finished last and first of the original six.

Registered clubs
The region's registered clubs as of October 2017 include:

See also
Sports in Sal, Cape Verde

References

External links
Official website 

Association football governing bodies in Cape Verde
Sport in Sal, Cape Verde
1975 establishments in Cape Verde